William Frazier may refer to:

 Wayne Frazier (William Wayne "Cotton" Frazier Sr., 1939–2012), American football player
 William Frazier (Wisconsin politician) (1833–1902), Wisconsin state legislator
 William Frazier (Virginia politician) (1812–1885), Virginia state legislator
William H. Frazier (1838–?), state legislator in South Carolina